Fruzsina Takács (born 15 August 1992, in Dunaújváros) is a Hungarian handballer who currently plays for Orosházi NKC in left back position.

References

External links
 Fruzsina Takács profile on Dunaújvárosi NKS Official Website
 Fruzsina Takács career statistics on Worldhandball.com

1992 births
Living people
Sportspeople from Dunaújváros
Hungarian female handball players
21st-century Hungarian women